The 2018 African Minifootball Cupwas the first edition of the African Minifootball Cup held by the African Minifootball Federation (AMF). The tournament was contested in Libya from 5–12 May 2018. This tournament served as the qualification for the 2019 WMF World Cup for the best four teams. Ivory Coast wins the tournament beating Senegal in the final on penalties kick 3–1 after a draw 3–3.

The next edition will held in Nigeria in 2020.

Venues

Teams

Group stage

Group A

Group B

Knockout stage

Semi-finals

3rd place match

Final

Qualified teams for the WMF World Cup
The following three teams from CAF qualified for the 2019 WMF World Cup.

1 Bold indicates champion for that year. Italic indicates host for that year.

Broadcasting

References

External links
انطلاق النسخة الأولى من بطولة أفريقيا لكرة القدم المصغرة - arabic.news

2018
International association football competitions hosted by Libya
2018 in Libyan sport
2018 in African football
Sport in Tripoli, Libya